The Lachte is a  right-hand tributary of the Aller in the Südheide Nature Park in the north German state of Lower Saxony.

Course 

The Lachte rises in the northern part of the district of Gifhorn southwest of Sprakensehl. In Steinhorst a stony ford crosses the river. Near Beedenbostel, Celle district, the Lutter and the Aschau join the Lachte from the right. Near Lachendorf the river swings west and discharges into the Aller near  (part of Altenhagen), a village within Celle district.

Although only following the western section of the river, the narrow gauge line from Celle to Wittingen was known as the Lachte Valley Railway.

See also 
List of rivers of Lower Saxony

References 

Rivers of Lower Saxony
Rivers of Germany